Fletcher is a town in Henderson County, North Carolina, United States. The population was 7,187 at the 2010 census, and was estimated to be 8,333 in 2018.

Fletcher is adjacent to Asheville Regional Airport, which serves western North Carolina. It is part of the Asheville Metropolitan Statistical Area.

History
Fletcher was first settled in 1795 when Samuel Murray decided to move his family to the mountains of western North Carolina. His family made the difficult journey from South Carolina up the old Howard Gap Road which, in areas, was little more than an old Indian trail. Samuel decided he wanted to live just east of the location where Howard Gap Road ended which is very close to where Fletcher Community Park is located today. Murray began buying property in what was then the Limestone District of Buncombe County.  Eventually he purchased more than 10,000 acres bounded roughly by Cane Creek to the south, the French Broad River to the west, Long Shoals Road to the north and Hooper’s Creek and Burney Mountain to the East.  In 1827, Samuel’s son opened the first post office in the Limestone District and the area became known as Murrayville.
The Town was used by Stateville, North Carolina to access the Asheville Metropolitan Area and is still being used to give Statesville access to the Asheville Metropolitan Area.

Murrayville became a strategic location because it was one of the main way-stations on the Buncombe Turnpike which was built in the early 1800s. This road quickly became the main passageway for families, farmers, and traders traveling from South Carolina up into Asheville and points north. In 1837, Murrayville was renamed Shufordsville after the newly appointed Postmaster Jacob Rhyne Shuford. Shortly thereafter in 1838, the state of North Carolina formed the last hundred of its counties and Shufordsville was no longer part of Buncombe County but rather part of the newly created Henderson County. Shufordsville continued to slowly grow and changed its name one last time when the town’s namesake, Dr. George Fletcher, became the local postmaster in 1886.

The Meadows and Rugby Grange are listed on the National Register of Historic Places.

Geography
Fletcher is located on the northern edge of Henderson County at  (35.432840, -82.506648). It is bordered to the north by the city of Asheville in Buncombe County. It is bordered to the west by the town of Mills River and to the east by unincorporated Hoopers Creek, both in Henderson County.

Interstate 26 passes through the western side of Fletcher, with access from Exits 40 and 44. U.S. Route 25 (Hendersonville Road) passes through the center of Fletcher, leading north  to the center of Asheville and south  to Hendersonville.

Demographics

2020 census

As of the 2020 United States census, there were 7,987 people, 3,468 households, and 2,127 families residing in the town.

2000 census
As of the census of 2000, there were 4,185 people, 1,744 households, and 1,248 families residing in the town. The population density was 791.1 people per square mile (305.5/km2). There were 1,816 housing units at an average density of 343.3 per square mile (132.5/km2). The racial makeup of the town was 93.60% White, 3.30% African American, 0.12% Native American, 1.27% Asian, 0.50% from other races, and 1.22% from two or more races. Hispanic or Latino of any race were 1.55% of the population.

There were 1,744 households, out of which 33.7% had children under the age of 18 living with them, 61.3% were married couples living together, 7.5% had a female householder with no husband present, and 28.4% were non-families. 23.8% of all households were made up of individuals, and 7.7% had someone living alone who was 65 years of age or older. The average household size was 2.40 and the average family size was 2.85.

In the town, the population was spread out, with 23.8% under the age of 18, 5.6% from 18 to 24, 35.8% from 25 to 44, 24.6% from 45 to 64, and 10.1% who were 65 years of age or older. The median age was 36 years. For every 100 females, there were 97.2 males. For every 100 females age 18 and over, there were 94.1 males.

The median income for a household in the town was $45,426, and the median income for a family was $51,688. Males had a median income of $35,976 versus $26,176 for females. The per capita income for the town was $20,607. About 4.6% of families and 7.4% of the population were below the poverty line, including 9.5% of those under age 18 and 10.7% of those age 65 or over.

Politics 
The town of Fletcher was incorporated in 1989. The first elected mayor of Fletcher was Robert (Bob) G. Parrish, Sr. (D), who died in his third term in office, July 2000. The current mayor of Fletcher is Preston Blakely who was elected November 2021. The town's motto is "Pride in our past, and faith in our future".

See also
Veritas Christian Academy

References

External links

 Town of Fletcher official website
 Henderson County Partnership for Economic Development

Towns in Henderson County, North Carolina
Towns in North Carolina
Asheville metropolitan area
Populated places established in 1883